Don't Forget Me (Ne zaboravi me, also known as Fergismajniht) is a 1996 Croatian film directed by Jakov Sedlar.

External links
 

1996 films
Croatian romantic drama films
1990s Croatian-language films
Films directed by Jakov Sedlar
Films set in Zagreb
Films set in the 1950s